Rinnan is a village in the municipality of Levanger in Trøndelag county, Norway. It is the site of the former military camp Rinnleiret and Rinnan Station, a station on the Nordlandsbanen railway line.

References

Villages in Trøndelag
Levanger